New Concepts of Artistry in Rhythm is an album by Stan Kenton. "Invention for Guitar and Trumpet" features guitarist Sal Salvador. A New York Times writer commented in 2003 that composer Bill Russo's "Improvisation" piece was "among the highest achievements in orchestral jazz".

Track listing

Original 1953 LP
Side A
 "23°N — 82°W" (Bill Russo)
 "Portrait of a Count" (Russo)
 "Invention for Guitar and Trumpet" (Bill Holman)
 "My Lady" (Russo)
 "Young Blood" (Gerry Mulligan)
 "Frank Speaking" (Russo)
Side B
 "Prologue (This Is an Orchestra!)" (Credited to Stan Kenton, Johnny Richards)
 "Improvisation" (Russo)

1989 CD Reissue
 "Prologue (This Is an Orchestra!)" (Credited to Bill Russo) - 9:57
 "Portrait of a Count" (Russo) - 
 "Young Blood" (Gerry Mulligan)
 "Frank Speaking" (Russo)
 "23°N — 82°W" (Russo)
 "Taboo"* (Margarita Lecuona, S.K. Russell)
 "Lonesome Train"* (Gene Roland)
 "Invention for Guitar and Trumpet" (Bill Holman)
 "My Lady" (Russo)
 "Swing House"* (Mulligan)
 "Improvisation" (Russo)
 "You Go to My Head"* (J. Fred Coots, Haven Gillespie)

Tracks 6, 7, 10 and 12 on CD were not part of the original LP but were recorded at the same sessions

Personnel
 Stan Kenton – piano
 Conte Candoli – trumpet
 Buddy Childers – trumpet
 Maynard Ferguson – trumpet
 Don Dennis – trumpet
 Ruben McFall – trumpet
 Bob Fitzpatrick – trombone
 Keith Moon – trombone
 Frank Rosolino – trombone
 Bill Russo – trombone
 George Roberts – bass trombone
 Lee Konitz – alto saxophone
 Vinnie Dean – alto saxophone
 Richie Kamuca – tenor saxophone
 Bill Holman – tenor saxophone
 Bob Gioga – baritone saxophone
 Sal Salvador – guitar
 Don Bagley - bass
 Stan Levey – drums
 Derek Walton – conga
 Kay Brown – vocals on "Lonesome Train"

References

Further reading
Stan Kenton: This Is an Orchestra! (University of North Texas Press, 2010) Chapter 12.

1953 albums
Stan Kenton albums
Capitol Records albums
Albums conducted by Stan Kenton